Loudoun v. Board of Trustees of the Loudoun County Library, 24 F. Supp. 2d 552 (E.D. Va. 1998), was a U.S. district court held that a county policy requiring filters on all of its public library Internet computers was an unconstitutional restriction of free speech.

References

External links
 

1998 in United States case law
United States District Court for the Eastern District of Virginia cases
United States Free Speech Clause case law